Wilma Joyce Shakespear  (born 4 March 1943), previously  known as Wilma Ritchie, is a former Australia netball international, Australia head coach and sports administrator. As a player, she represented Australia at the 1963 World Netball Championships, winning a gold medal. Shakespear coached Australia at the 1971, 1979 and 1987 World Netball Championships and at the 1989 World Games. Shakespear also served as head netball coach at the Australian Institute of Sport. Shakespear is married to Peter Shakespear, a former Australian rower. In 1992 she was made a Member of the Order of Australia. As a sports administrator she was the founding director of both the Queensland Academy of Sport and the English Institute of Sport. In 2010 she was inducted into the Australian Netball Hall of Fame.

Playing career
As Wilma Ritchie, Shakespear represented Australia at the inaugural 1963 World Netball Championships winning a gold medal. She made seven senior appearances for Australia.

Coaching career

Australia
Shakespear coached Australia at the 1971, 1979 and 1987 World Netball Championships and at the 1989 World Games. Under Shakespear, Australia were gold medalists in 1971 and 1979 and silver medalists in 1987 and 1989.

Australian Institute of Sport
Between 1981 and 1990, Shakespear served as head coach at the Australian Institute of Sport. She was the first head coach of the AIS netball program.

Sports administrator

Honours

Player
Australia
World Netball Championships
Winners: 1963

Head coach
Australia
World Netball Championships
Winners: 1971, 1979
Runners up: 1987
World Games
Runners up: 1989
Individual
Australian Netball Hall of Fame
Inducted: 2010

Bibliography
Wilma Shakespear, Margaret Caldow: Netball:Steps to Success (1979)

References

Living people
1943 births
Australian netball players
Australia international netball players
Netball players from Victoria (Australia)
Australian netball coaches
Australia national netball team coaches
Australian Institute of Sport netball coaches
Recipients of the Australian Sports Medal
Recipients of the Medal of the Order of Australia
Australian sports executives and administrators
Australian Institute of Sport administrators
Australian netball administrators
Esso/Mobil Superleague coaches
1963 World Netball Championships players
Sportswomen from Victoria (Australia)